Come Through with Rebecca Carroll is a podcast about racism that is produced by WNYC Studios.

Background 
The show was produced in 2020 during a surge in hate crimes committed against Asian Americans and the COVID-19 pandemic was disproportionately killing black people. The show discusses racism in the United States and how it effects every aspect of life. Carroll mainly interviews people of minority groups or more specifically BAME. Carroll interviewed Waubgeshig Rice about climate change. The show has included interviews with people such as Don Lemon, Robin DiAngelo, and Walter Mosley.

Reception 
Samantha Vincenty of Oprah Daily, compared the show to the WHYY-FM show Fresh Air.

References

External links 

Audio podcasts
2020 podcast debuts
2020 podcast endings
Political podcasts
WNYC Studios programs